Bergens Tidende is Norway's fifth-largest newspaper, and the country's largest newspaper outside Oslo.

Bergens Tidende is owned by the public company Schibsted ASA. Norwegian owners held a mere 42% of the shares in Schibsted at the end of 2015.

History and profile
Founded in 1868, Bergens Tidende is based in Bergen. The newspaper is published in two sections. Section one contains op-eds, general news, sports, and weather. Section two contains culture, views, local news, and television listings. The feature magazine BTMagasinet is published on Saturdays.

Bergens Tidende is owned by the public company Schibsted, which also owns Aftenposten,  Stavanger Aftenblad, and Fædrelandsvennen. At least 30% of the shares of Schibsted are owned by foreign investment banks and insurance companies, such as Goldman Sachs. The paper began to be published in tabloid format in 2006.

The paper was awarded the European Newspaper of the Year in the regional newspaper category by the European Newspapers Congress in 2011.

In 2005 Bergens Tidende reached about 260,000 readers every day, mainly in the county of Vestland. Circulation numbers peaked at 100,000 copies in 1988. Its circulation was about 87,000 copies in 2007. In 2008 the paper had a circulation of 85,825 copies, and later dropped to 70,220 copies by 2015.

Website
The website of Bergens Tidende is bt.no. Until 2009, the newspaper broadcast on BTV (formerly TV Hordaland), but service was taken off air and incorporated into bt.no.

List of editors-in-chief
 Edvard Larssen, Jan - Apr 1868
 Johan Hekleberg, 1868–1869
 David Chrystie Habe, 1869–1871
 Olav Lofthus, 1872–1894
 , 1894–1902
 K. F. Dahl, 1902–1903
 , 1903–1942
 Vidkunn Nitter Schreiner, 1942–1945
 Håkon Torsvik, 1945–1956
 Ingemund Fænn, 1956–1977
 Kjartan Rødland, 1977–1986
 Einar Eriksen, 1986–1991
 Magne Gaasemyr, 1991–1994
 Hans Erik Matre, 1994–1997
 Einar Hålien, 1997–2008
 Trine Eilertsen, 2008–2012
 Gard Steiro, 2012–2015
 Øyulf Hjertenes, 2015–2019
 , 2019–present

References

External links
bt.no
BTV

1868 establishments in Norway
Daily newspapers published in Norway
Newspapers established in 1868
Newspapers published in Bergen
Norwegian-language newspapers
Norwegian news websites